Argiope ("silver face") may refer to:
 Argiope (mythology), several figures from Greek mythology
 Argiope (spider), a genus of spiders which includes the St Andrew's Cross spider and the wasp spider